Road Apples is the second studio album by Canadian rock band The Tragically Hip. The album contains the hit singles "Three Pistols", “Little Bones,” and “Twist My Arm." During the Hip's last tour, in 2016, songs from this album were played live on a regular basis, featuring the above-mentioned songs as well as ”Long Time Running”, “Last of the Unplucked Gems”, “The Luxury”, and “Fiddler's Green.” References to many prominent figures were used, including Tom Thomson and Jacques Cousteau, as well as political situations in Sault Ste. Marie, Ontario. The track “Fiddler's Green" was written for Gord Downie's young nephew, who died during the writing of the album. Because of the personal nature of the song, the Hip did not play it live often, but they played it on a regular basis during their final tour.

Recording sessions were held at the Daniel Lanois' personal studio in New Orleans in September 1990 on the recommendation of Colin Cripps, at the time a member of the band Crash Vegas. He said that the studio had helped establish the mood for the album Red Earth.

Title
The name of the album is a Canadian slang term for horse droppings; with allusion to the fact that along the side of a road they can be found in shape and size of apples. The album's original working title was Saskadelphia, but this was rejected by the record label as likely to confuse listeners; however, the title was later reused for a 2021 EP of previously unreleased rarities from the Road Apples sessions.

Commercial performance
Road Apples was the band's first album to reach  in Canada.  The album has been certified Diamond in Canada.

Deluxe edition
A deluxe edition of the album was reissued in 2021 to mark its 30th anniversary. The reissue included a remastered version of the original album, the six-song Saskadelphia EP, a live concert performance recorded at the Roxy Theatre in 1991, and a disc of outtakes and demo versions of the album's songs.

The Roxy Theatre live disc was also separately released as the live album Live at the Roxy in 2022.

Track listing

Personnel
Gord Downie – lead vocals
Rob Baker – lead guitar
Paul Langlois – rhythm guitar
Gord Sinclair – bass guitar, backing vocals
Johnny Fay – drums

References

1991 albums
The Tragically Hip albums
MCA Records albums